Sphyraena waitii is a species of ray-finned fish within the family Sphyraenidae. It is endemic to the Indo-Pacific Ocean, where it lives on coasts along eastern Australia fromsouthern Queensland to eastern Victoria at depths of 5 to 45 meters in pelagic-neritic environments. Individuals can grow up to 31 centimeters in length.

References 

Fish described in 1908
Sphyraenidae
Taxa named by James Douglas Ogilby
Marine fish of Australia